The Song of Jacob Zulu is an American play that debuted on Broadway in 1993. Written by Tug Yourgrau, with lyrics by Tug Yourgrau and Ladysmith Black Mambazo and music by Ladysmith Black Mambazo and produced by the Steppenwolf Theatre Company, the play is a drama set during Apartheid in South Africa. The play's Broadway production was nominated for six Tony Awards, including Best Play, Best Actor in a Play for K. Todd Freeman, and Best Featured Actor in a Play for Zakes Mokae.

References

External links

 (archive)

1993 plays
Broadway plays
South Africa in fiction